Gwaldam is a hill station in India, situated between the Garhwal and Kumaon,  from Kausani.

Geography

Gwaldam is a small town itself, the main reason for its prosperity is its being a junction of Kumaon and Garhwal and many paths lead to different areas and villages. It is also a base camp for the trekkers who enter from Kathgodam (Nainital) railhead on trekking route to Lord Curzon Trail (Kuari Pass), Nanda Devi Raj Jat and Roopkund. Once it was a mandi for potato and apple trade.

There are a number of picnic and devotional spots in the area like Badhangarhi, Gwaldam naag, Angyari mahadev, Machchi taal, Buddha temple, river sites of Pindar, and a wildlife rich area along the Roopkund road. The main village of Atal Adarsh Gram Gwaldam is talla Gwaldam which is situated 2 kilometer from Gwaldam market, known for its ancient Dak-khana (post office) and Chaykhana (tea factory). The Britisher Curzon Trail built a track connecting Gwaldam to Roopkund which passes through the various places like Devtaal, Nandkeshri, Deval, Mundoli and Waana Gaon. Talla Gwaldam people have a strong belief on Goddess bhagwati for which devotee comes for worship from all around during bhado (bhadrpad). Here one suspicious box placed near the village is still the center of attraction which is placed here since British period.

History
Historically, Gwaldam is a part of Garhwal hills and situated at the borderline between Garhwal and Kumaon.
A number of battles were fought here in past. It being on a strategic point it remained an apple of discord between the Garhwal and Kumaon kings. Gwaldam is situated at the saddle of Gwaldam-Shisakhani ridge and Gwaldam-Badhangarhi ridge. Border could be crossed through Gwaldam only. South of these ridges is Kumaon and north is Garhwal. Later Katyuri kings, who hailed from Joshimath, and had sympathy for King of Garhwal because of lineage. King of Badhangarhi was under king of Garhwal and had not in good term with King of Kumaon but had good relation with Katyuri king because of neighborhoods. All these led to a situation between Kumaon and Garhwal kings. In order to browbeat king of Badhangarhi in last decade of 16th century, Chand king sent Parkhu, a great warrior to fight with king of Badhangarhi. Unfortunately, line of supply was cut short by the Katyuri king and Parkhu was beheaded at Binayakdhar, perhaps nearby crossroad  at Gwaldam. King of Garhwal rewarded the soldier who brought the head to Shrinagar. This infuriated the Chand King, Rudra Chand and he personally led the troops and captured the Katyuri king and later killed the Katyuri king Sukhal Deo and exiled his family. Atkinson, in his work, "The Himalayan Gazetteer", narrated these episodes.

Because of strategic importance a base camp of ITBP was established in 1960s and SSB training center was established in 1970s which was meant for some secret military operation. Locally, then it was known as secret service bureau. SSB imparted guerilla warfare training. In Uttarakhand a number of SSB guerilla trained persons are still ready to serve for any cause. At present a small unit of SSB is present at Gwaldam that runs occasional training courses. Major activities are shifted some elsewhere. Training grounds, sports fields, stadium, helipads and other infra-structure facility are still here. Local people expect that this large chunk of land, about 10 square kilometer could be used as adventure sports university or other activity.

A hydro-electric power project of 252 MW is under construction. Head of this project is at Nandkesari on the river Pindar, a tributary of the holy river Ganga.

The women-centric Maiti movement, which involves a unique ritual of planting a sapling by a newly-wedded couple, was initiated in Gwaldam by environmentalist Kalyan Singh Rawat in 1994. It is a program intended to develop eco-awareness among the people.

Central School, Government Inter College, Girls Junior high School, Vidya-Mandir, Shishu-Mandir and other study, coaching centers are here. Krishi-Vigyan Kendra, Animal Husbandry, Veterinary Center, Fruit Processing Center, Forest Rest House, GMVN Tourist Rest House, State Bank, Chamoli District Cooperative bank branch, are also available here. For basic health care a government allopathic hospital is also available here. Presently under Rashtriya Krishi Vikas Yojana, schemes like strengthening of Angora breeding farm and pilot project for establishment of Barbara goat are sanctioned. 

Previously it was a private degree college founded by a freedom fighter, politician, educationist and member of legislative assembly in erstwhile Uttar Pradesh, Sher Singh Danu. A State Bank of India ATM is located in the main market. Airport is yet not functional. Several hotels and Garhwal Mandal Vikas Nigam guesthouses are available. Among the legacies of British Raj the Barudghar (explosive store house), Dakkhana (post office), Chaykhana (Tea Factory), Janglat Dak Bungalow (Forest Rest House) only FRH survives with its heritage building. A lake, 'Nirmal Sarovar' (named after a great Forester NK Joshi), in FRH campus is a point of attraction here. Civil Society Gwaldam and NEEDS are social welfare associations that are active here.

See also
Lolti
Kulsari
Badhangarhi temple

References

 The Himalayan Gazetteer  by E.T. Atkinson (Author)
 http://chamoli.nic.in/pages/display/79-gwaldam
 www.censusindia.gov.in (Category : statistics of chamoli district) District  Census  Hand Book Chamoli, Census of India 2011, Uttarakhand : Series 06 - Part XII-B

Hill stations in Uttarakhand
Tourism in Uttarakhand
Cities and towns in Chamoli district